Novoalexeyevka is a rural locality (a selo) in Lapshinskoye Rural Settlement, Kotovsky District, Volgograd Oblast, Russia. The population was 113 as of 2010.

Geography 
Novoalexeyevka is located in steppe, on Volga Upland, on the right bank of the Malaya Olkhovka River, 18 km northeast of Kotovo (the district's administrative centre) by road. Lapshinskaya is the nearest rural locality.

References 

Rural localities in Kotovsky District